Jiři Suchánek (born 9 May 1982) is a Czech para table tennis player who competes in international level events. He is a World and Paralympic bronze medalist and a five-time European medalist.

Suchánek was involved in a serious car accident in 1999 when the car that he was driving crashed into another car that was driven by a driver who was under the influence of alcohol and was unlicensed, the other driver was killed at the scene. This led to him paralysed from the 5th and 6th cervical vertebrae, he spent nine months in a specialist hospital in Chlumín, he got involved in para table tennis in 2005 and competed internationally two years later in 2007.

References

1982 births
Living people
Sportspeople from Liberec
Paralympic table tennis players of the Czech Republic
Table tennis players at the 2016 Summer Paralympics
Medalists at the 2016 Summer Paralympics
Table tennis players at the 2020 Summer Paralympics
Czech male table tennis players